Victor Bridges (real name Victor George de Freyne, 14 March 1878 – 29 November 1972) was a prolific English author of detective and fantasy fiction, and also a playwright and occasional poet.

Life
Born on 14 March 1878 at Clifton, Bristol, Victor George de Freyne may have been connected with a propertied family in County Sligo, Ireland. He was educated at Haileybury and Imperial Service College. He worked as a bank employee and as an actor in repertory theatre before becoming a full-time writer.

Bridges began to publish crime and mystery stories and novels regularly in 1909. He was an early signing by the new London publishing firm of Mills & Boon, which was initially a light fiction publisher in a wide range of genres. Many of his stories were set in Essex and East Anglia. He also had two volumes of poetry published.

He married in 1920 Margaret Lindsay Mackay, who died in 1957. He himself died on 29 November 1972.

Selected works

References

External links
 Victor Bridges - Fantastic Fiction
 Serial part of I Did Not Kill Osborne from the Sarasota Herald-Tribune, 10 December 1934.
 
 

1878 births
1972 deaths
20th-century British writers
Occasional poets